Lisowice may refer to the following places in Poland:
Lisowice, Legnica County in Lower Silesian Voivodeship (south-west Poland)
Lisowice, Środa Śląska County in Lower Silesian Voivodeship (south-west Poland)
Lisowice, Łódź East County in Łódź Voivodeship (central Poland)
Lisowice, Pajęczno County in Łódź Voivodeship (central Poland)
Lisowice, Silesian Voivodeship (south Poland)